Altınoluk is a village in Yüksekova District in Hakkâri Province in Turkey. The village is populated by Kurds of the Dirî and Kaşuran tribes and had a population of 705 in 2021.

Population 
Population history of the village from 2000 to 2022:

References 

Villages in Yüksekova District
Kurdish settlements in Hakkâri Province